Fireworks Entertainment (originally Skyvision Entertainment) was an independent studio originally founded in 1991 by Brian K. Ross and later bought out by Jay Firestone in 1996 to produce, distribute and finance television shows and feature films.

Skyvision Entertainment was originally operating as a division of John Labatt Entertainment Group.

In 1993, Orion Pictures inked an agreement with Skyvision Entertainment to handle series rights to the RoboCop franchise. Also that year, it entered into an agreement with Rigel Entertainment for international distribution rights to RoboCop: The Series.

In 1996, Skyvision Entertainment was purchased by Jay Firestone, former employee of Alliance Communications, and rebranded it to Fireworks Entertainment. The first show under the new name was F/X: The Series, which they acquired from Orion Pictures in 1994.

Fireworks was acquired by Canwest Global in May 1998, and was later sold to ContentFilm (production company of The Cooler), a British company, in April 2005. Over the years, Fireworks has amassed a significant catalogue of television shows and movies (under the Fireworks Pictures label).

In 1998, Peter Hoffman's Seven Arts Pictures formed an alliance with Fireworks to start out the Seven Arts International branding. In 2000, CanWest Films merged with Seven Arts International, another Canwest subsidiary to start the Fireworks Pictures branding to produce theatrical motion pictures. On October 2, 2001, Pliny Porter was hired as head of production and development for the Fireworks Pictures subsidiary, in order to make an effort to continue producing their own feature films.

On March 14, 2011, Fireworks International was renamed as Content Television  and its parent company, ContentFilm was also renamed as Content Media Corporation, which was later acquired by Canadian-based Kew Media Group in 2017 and after Kew Media's liquidation and collapse in 2020, its library was later acquired by Quiver Distribution via its Quiver Entertainment division.

Court cases 
The original company was sued by Sony regarding Queen of Swords and by 20th Century Fox regarding Mutant X.

Television shows (as Fireworks Entertainment) 
TV shows filmed in widescreen 16:9 from 2000 but generally broadcast in 4:3 pan and scan. The widescreen versions are available on DVD.

 100 Deeds for Eddie McDowd
 18 Wheels of Justice
 Adventure Inc.
 Andromeda (Gene Roddenberry)
 Black Hole High
 Caitlin's Way
 Even Stevens (co-produced by Disney Channel)
 F/X: The Series
 Highlander: The Raven
 La Femme Nikita (co-produced by Warner Bros. Television)
 Mutant X
 Queen of Swords
 Relic Hunter
RoboCop: The Series
 RoboCop: Prime Directives (TV miniseries)
SCTV (distribution only; inherited from WIC during CanWest era)
 Zoe Busiek: Wild Card
 Young Dracula

Films (as Fireworks Pictures) 
 A Wrinkle in Time
 An American Rhapsody
 Better Than Sex
 Coronado
 Faithless
 Greenfingers
 Hardball
 Innocence
 Interstate 60
 Me Without You
 Nola
 Passionada
 Raising Victor Vargas
 Rat Race
 Simon Magus
 Solas
 The Believer
 The Man from Elysian Fields
 Who Is Cletis Tout?

References 

Mass media companies established in 1991
Mass media companies disestablished in 2011
Film production companies of Canada
Film production companies of the United Kingdom
Film production companies of the United States
Former Corus Entertainment subsidiaries